Walter Bird may refer to: 

 Walter Bird (cricketer) (1854–1921), British cricketer
 Walter James Bird (1863–1953), English organ-builder
 Walter Bird (footballer) (1891–1965), British footballer
 Walter Bird (photographer) (1903–1969), British photographer
 Walter Bird, founder of the American company Birdair in 1957